Thierry Morin (born 12 December 1957) is a French former professional footballer who played as a defender. He works as the general secretary of the Association Paris Saint-Germain as of April 2022.

Playing career 
Morin's first youth club was Stade Saint-Germain, his hometown club at which he stayed from 1966 until the merger with Paris FC to form Paris Saint-Germain in 1970. He would join the PSG Academy that year. His first team debut came on 21 December 1975 in a 3–2 loss to Reims. Morin was one of the four PSG academy graduates called the "four musketeers", along with Lionel Justier, Jean-Marc Pilorget, and François Brisson.

During his 11 years as a pro player at PSG, Morin won one Division 1 and two Coupe de France titles. His only goal came in a 1–1 draw against Monaco on 17 August 1982. He left for Red Star in 1986 after having made 174 appearances for the Parisians in all competitions.

From 1986 to 1989, while playing for Red Star, Morin was simultaneously head of the club's youth academy. However, he retired in 1989, and left the youth academy role as well.

Post-playing career 
In 1989, after retiring from playing football, Morin returned to Paris Saint-Germain as an employee. He became science professor at the Camp des Loges and director of the multi-sport Centre de Formation d’Apprentis (CFA) project initiated by the club. In 1994, he experienced PSG's second league title, but this time as an employee. By the 2020s decade, Morin was still working in the youth academy of PSG. In an interview in 2017, he humorously described himself as the "dinosaur" of PSG. As of April 2022, he works as the general secretary of the Association Paris Saint-Germain.

In the 2000s decade, Morin was vice president of the association of former PSG players.

Personal life 
Morin has a family who had a love for sports. His parents were basketball players in Saint-Germain-en-Laye, and his brothers played football as well. Morin himself, his family, and his children were all born in Saint-Germain-en-Laye.

Honours 
Paris Saint-Germain
 French Division 1: 1985–86
 Coupe de France: 1981–82, 1982–83; runner-up: 1984–85

References

External links 
 

Living people
1957 births
French footballers
Association football defenders
Sportspeople from Saint-Germain-en-Laye
Stade Saint-Germain players
Paris Saint-Germain F.C. players
Red Star F.C. players
French Division 3 (1971–1993) players
Ligue 1 players
Ligue 2 players
Paris Saint-Germain F.C. non-playing staff
Footballers from Yvelines